Subba Rayudi Pelli is a 1992 Telugu-language comedy film, produced by A. Siddha Reddy, M. Chandra Reddy and P. Munikrishna under the Gowri Shankar Creations banner and directed by Dasari Narayana Rao. It stars Rajendra Prasad, Aishwarya with music composed by Vasu Rao.

Cast
Rajendra Prasad as Subba Rayudu
Aishwarya as Lalitha
Rami Reddy
Allu Ramalingaiah
Subhalekha Sudhakar
Brahmanandam
Babu Mohan
Mada 
Maganti Sudhakar
Jayalalita
Silk Smitha  
Y. Vijaya

Soundtrack

References

External links

1992 films
1990s Telugu-language films
1992 comedy-drama films
Films directed by Dasari Narayana Rao
Indian comedy-drama films